Scott Chisholm may refer to:

 Scot Chisholm (entrepreneur) (born 1981), American social entrepreneur 
 Scott Chisholm (footballer) (born 1973), Australian footballer
 Scott Chisholm (actor) (born 1993), British actor